Man's Heart is a British-Malaysian tragedy silent film about the overseas Chinese community in the tin mining industry. Produced and released in 1928, the film was presented by the Kwong Kwong Motion Picture Company, which was located in Seremban, Negeri Sembilan state. Its film crew and shooting equipment came from the past Nanyang Low Pui-kim's self-made Motion Picture Company in Singapore.

Release record 
 Seremban, Negeri Sembilan, Malaysia
 Premiere in "(時新戲院)" in Seremban
 Singapore
 one ticket to watch two movies, with another 1927 silent film "(血淚碑)" from Shanghai Star Motion Pictures Company, in Marlborough Theatre (曼舞羅戲院) in Beach Road, Singapore, total four days, from 29 November to 2 December 1928.

Plot 
In order to seek more girlfriends, a Chinese man abandons his family, leaving his wife and son to a hard life. In the end, all his lovers leave him, and he suffers retribution for his sin.

External links

References 

1928 films
British silent feature films
Malaysian black-and-white films
Films about immigration
British black-and-white films